Polygaster is a genus of parasitic flies in the family Tachinidae.

Species
Polygaster brasiliensis Townsend, 1917
Polygaster egregia Wulp, 1890
Polygaster ivu (Townsend, 1928)

References

Diptera of North America
Diptera of South America
Dexiinae
Tachinidae genera
Taxa named by Frederik Maurits van der Wulp